The Northern Ireland national football team have appeared in the finals of the FIFA World Cup on three occasions.

Their best World Cup performance was in their first appearance in the finals, the 1958 World Cup, where they reached the quarter-finals after beating Czechoslovakia 2–1 in the play-off. They were knocked out by France, losing 4–0. In the 1958 competition Northern Ireland became the least populous country to have qualified for the World Cup, a record that stood until Trinidad & Tobago qualified for the 2006 World Cup. Northern Ireland remains, however, the least populous country to have qualified for more than one World Cup finals tournament, to win a World Cup finals match, to have scored at a World Cup finals, and to have progressed from the first round of the World Cup finals.

Captain of the national side at the 1958 World Cup was Danny Blanchflower, who also captained Tottenham Hotspur in the English league and was twice footballer of the year in England. His younger brother Jackie was also a key member of the national team, and won two league titles in England with Manchester United, until his career was ended by injuries suffered in the Munich air disaster of February 1958.

Despite the presence of world class forward George Best, another Manchester United player, for most of the 1960s and into the 1970s, Northern Ireland failed to qualify for any major tournaments during this time.

Northern Ireland also qualified for the 1982 World Cup. Their opening game was against Yugoslavia at the La Romareda in Zaragoza. It was the international debut of 17-year-old Norman Whiteside who became the youngest player ever in the World Cup finals, a record that still stands. The game finished goalless. Five days later they drew 1–1 with Honduras, which was a disappointment, and many believed had doomed Northern Ireland's chances of advancing in the competition. They needed a win against hosts Spain in the third and final group game at the Mestalla Stadium in Valencia. They faced a partisan atmosphere with a mostly Spanish crowd and a Spanish speaking referee in Héctor Ortiz who was unwilling to punish dirty play from the Spanish players. However a mistake from goalkeeper Luis Arconada gifted Gerry Armstrong the only goal of the game, and despite having Mal Donaghy sent off on 60 minutes, Northern Ireland went on to record an historic 1–0 win and top the first stage group.

A 2–2 draw with Austria at the Vicente Calderón Stadium meant that a win against France would take them into the semi-finals, however a French team inspired by Michel Platini won 4–1 and eliminated Northern Ireland from the competition.

In the 1986 World Cup, they reached the first round. Billy Bingham, a member of the 1958 squad, was manager for both of these tournaments.

Record at the FIFA World Cup

*Denotes draws including knockout matches decided on penalty kicks.

By Match

Record by Opponent

Northern Ireland at Sweden 1958

First round

Group 1

Play-off

Quarter-final 1958 World Cup

Northern Ireland at 1982 World Cup

Squad
Head coach: Billy Bingham

Matches

Northern Ireland at 1986 World Cup

Squad
Head coach: Billy Bingham

Matches

Record players
One of Northern Ireland's record World Cup players, Norman Whiteside, also holds the record for the youngest player ever to appear in the tournament. When he was fielded against Yugoslavia, he was only 17 years and 41 days old.

Top goalscorers

References

 
Countries at the FIFA World Cup